Nikolai Afanasyevich Kryuchkov (6 January 1911 – 13 April 1994) was a Soviet and Russian stage and film actor. He appeared in more than 90 films between 1932 and 1993.

Selected filmography

 Outskirts (1933)
 By the Bluest of Seas (1936)
 The Return of Maxim (1937)
 The Vyborg Side (1939)
 Salavat Yulayev (1941)
 They Met in Moscow (1941)
 In the Rear of the Enemy (1941)
 In the Name of the Fatherland (1943)
 Heavenly Slug (1945)
 Happy Flight (1949)
 The Battle of Stalingrad (1949)
 The Lights of Baku (1950)
 Sporting Honour (1951)
 Bountiful Summer (1951)
 The Star (1953)
 Ernst Thälmann - Führer seiner Klasse (1955)
 The Forty-First (1956)
 Leningrad Symphony (1957)
 Over Tissa (1958)
 Ballad of a Soldier (1959)
 Cruelty (1959)
 Hussar Ballad (1962)
 Balzaminov's Marriage (1964)
 Come Here, Mukhtar! (1965)
 There Was an Old Couple (1965)
 Give me a complaints book (1965)
 Two Comrades Were Serving (1968)
 Town People (1975)
 Autumn Marathon (1979)
 Battle of Moscow (1985)
 Stalingrad (1989)

Awards and honors
 Three Orders of the Red Banner of Labour (1939, 1967, 1971)
 Two Orders of Lenin (1940, 1980)
 Stalin Prize, 1st class (1941)
 Honored Artist of the RSFSR (1942)
 Order of the Red Star (1944)
 People's Artist of the RSFSR (1950) 
People's Artist of the USSR (1965)
Order of the October Revolution (1974)
Hero of Socialist Labour (1980)
Order of the Patriotic War, 1st class (1985)
 Nika Award for the Lifetime Achievement Award (1991)

References

External links

1911 births
1994 deaths
20th-century Russian male actors
Male actors from Moscow
Communist Party of the Soviet Union members
Heroes of Socialist Labour
Honored Artists of the RSFSR
People's Artists of the RSFSR
People's Artists of the USSR
Stalin Prize winners
Recipients of the Nika Award
Recipients of the Order of Lenin
Recipients of the Order of the Red Banner of Labour
Recipients of the Order of the Red Star
Socialist realism
Russian male film actors
Russian male silent film actors
Russian male stage actors
Russian male voice actors
Soviet male film actors
Soviet male silent film actors
Soviet male stage actors
Soviet male voice actors
Soviet military personnel of World War II
Burials at Novodevichy Cemetery